Padma Shri Award, India's fourth highest civilian honours - Winners, 1990-1999:

Recipients

References

Explanatory notes

Non-citizen recipients

External links
 
 

Recipients of the Padma Shri
Lists of Indian award winners
1990s in India
1990s-related lists